John Paul II Catholic High School (JPII), located in Greenville, North Carolina is a four-year private coeducational college-preparatory Catholic high school that is an inclusive community where students of all faiths are welcome. The school aims to follow the teaching of Jesus Christ: to form men and women of faith, knowledge, and service in church and community. Within the tradition of its Catholic faith, the school aims to build character through the development of the whole person in mind, body, and spirit while instilling a commitment to lifelong learning.

History
In 2010, Pope John Paul II High School in Greenville, North Carolina, became the second diocesan high school in the Diocese of Raleigh. In the 2010–2011 school year, the high school taught only ninth grade. It added grades 10–12 as students advanced through the 2013–2014 school year. The high school expansion mirrors growth in other areas of the diocese.

On July 1, 2021, John Paul II Catholic High School officially transitioned from a diocesan school to an independent, diocesan-approved, college preparatory Catholic private high school. Diocese of Raleigh Bishop Luis Rafael Zarama and Superintendent of Catholic Schools Lytia Reese previously announced the transition on January 22, 2021. This change, which was prompted by the recent growth and success of the school, enables the school to continue to flourish by maintaining and expanding investment beyond the diocese's ability to do so in the previous structure.

See also

National Catholic Educational Association

Notes and references

External links
Official website

Catholic secondary schools in North Carolina
Educational institutions established in 2010
2010 establishments in North Carolina